A list of mountain ranges in Kyrgyzstan includes 158 mountain ranges in Central Tien-Shan (16), North Tien-Shan (19), Internal Tien-Shan (48), West Tien-Shan (30), South Tien-Shan (41), and Pamir-Alay (4).

Mountain Ranges of Central Tien-Shan

Mountain Ranges of North Tien-Shan

Mountain Ranges of Internal Tien-Shan

Mountain Ranges of West Tien-Shan

Mountain Ranges of South Tien-Shan

Pamir-Alay

References

Kyrgyzstan, Lists of mountain ranges of
Mountain ranges